Donald A. Ritchie (born December 23, 1945) is Historian Emeritus of the United States Senate.

Education

He graduated from the City College of New York in 1967; and received a master's degree, in 1969, and a Ph.D., in 1975, from the University of Maryland, College Park.

Career

Ritchie served in the U.S. Marine Corps from 1969 to 1971.

As associate historian in the Senate Historical Office, beginning in 1976, Ritchie conducted oral history interviews with former senators and retired members of Senate staff as part of the Senate oral history project. In 2009 he became the Senate historian, succeeding Richard Baker, and held that post until his retirement in 2015.

Ritchie was responsible for editing the closed hearing transcripts of Senator Joseph R. McCarthy's investigations, and has authored a number of books including Electing FDR. His book Press Gallery: Congress and the Washington Correspondents won him the Richard W. Leopold Prize of the Organization of American Historians.  He has served as president of the Oral History Association and on the councils of the American Historical Association and the International Oral History Association, as well as on the board of the Society for History in the Federal Government.

Works

Academic:
 Washington's Iron Butterfly: Bess Clements Abell, an Oral History, with Terry L. Birdwhistell. University Press of Kentucky. 2022.
 The Columnist: Leaks, Lies, and Libel in Drew Pearson's Washington. Oxford University Press. 2021.
 The U.S. Congress: A Very Short Introduction. Oxford University Press. 2022. 
 Electing FDR: The New Deal Campaign of 1932. University Press of Kansas. 2007. 
 Our Constitution. Oxford University Press. 2006. 
 
 
 
 

 Press Gallery: Congress and the Washington Correspondents. Harvard University Press. 1991. 
 James M. Landis: Dean of the Regulators. Harvard University Press. 1980.

Textbooks:
  United States History and Geography, The American Vision, The American Republic, and The American Journey, with Joyce Appleby, Alan Brinkley, Albert Broussard, and James McPherson (Glencoe/McGraw-Hill)
  United States Government, with Richard C. Remy, Lena Morreale Scott, and Megan L. Hanson (McGraw-Hill).	

Editing:
 The Oxford Handbook of Oral History (Oxford University Press, 2010)
 Congress and Harry S. Truman: A Conflicted Legacy (Truman State University Press, 2011)

References

External links
 
 C-SPAN Q&A interview with Ritchie, August 15, 2010
 Don Ritchie on the History of the Oral History Association, September 25, 2015. 
 "Donald Ritchie on Deep Throat." [interview], National Review, June 1, 2005
 "Interview with Donald A. Ritchie, Oral Historian at the USA senate", veruscacalabria, August 9, 2010
 Fast Forward: Oral History in the 21st Century by Donald Ritchie
 The Election of 1932: Photographs
 The Election of 1932: Cartoons

1945 births
21st-century American historians
21st-century American male writers
City College of New York alumni
Employees of the United States Senate
Living people
United States Marines
University of Maryland, College Park alumni
Historians of the United States Senate
American male non-fiction writers